Arangu-ye Bala (also Romanized as Ārangū-ye Bālā and Ārangū Bālā; also known as Ārangū, Āremgū, and Ārengūy-e Bālā) is a village in Senderk Rural District, Senderk District, Minab County, Hormozgan Province, Iran. At the 2006 census, its population was 655, in 135 families.

References 

Populated places in Minab County